Konstantine Bagration of Mukhrani may refer to:

 Konstantine Bagration of Mukhrani (1838–1903), Georgian nobleman
 Konstantine Bagration of Mukhrani (1889–1915), Georgian nobleman